Chaganam Rajupalem is a village panchayath located in the Sydapuram Mandal, Nellore district of Andhra Pradesh state, India.

Demographics
The local language of the village is Telugu. The total population is 2,987. Males are 1,517 and females are 1,470, living in 728 houses. The total area of Chaganam is 30.24 square kilometers.

References 

 Villages in Nellore district
 Mining communities in India